Jefferson Township is one of nineteen townships in Ashe County, North Carolina, United States. The township had a population of 4,718 as of the 2010 census and is the largest township in Ashe County by population.

Jefferson Township occupies  in central Ashe County. The incorporated municipalities within Jefferson Township are the town of Jefferson, the county seat of Ashe County, and parts of the town of West Jefferson.

References

Townships in Ashe County, North Carolina
Townships in North Carolina